The men's qualification for football tournament at the 1991 All-Africa Games.

Qualification stage

Zone I (North Africa)
Libya and Morocco withdrew.

|}

Tunisia qualified.

Zone II (West Africa 1)
Gambia withdrew.

|}

Mali qualified.

Zone III (West Africa 2)
First round

|}

Second round

|}

Nigeria qualified.

Zone IV (Central Africa)
Qualifying tournament of Zone IV was combined with the 1990 UDEAC Cup.

Cameroon qualified after Congo withdrawal.

Zone V (East Africa)

|}

Zone VI (Southern Africa)
A tournament was organised in Windhoek, Namibia between Botswana, Zimbabwe, Lesotho, Namibia, Malawi and Zambia.

Zimbabwe qualified.

Zone VII (Indian Ocean)
Mauritius qualified.

Qualifying teams
The following countries have qualified for the final tournament:

External links
African Games 1991 - Rec.Sport.Soccer Statistics Foundation

Qualification
1991